John Cassidy (born 7 June 1952) is a Canadian speed skater. He competed in the men's 500 metres event at the 1972 Winter Olympics.

References

1952 births
Living people
Canadian male speed skaters
Olympic speed skaters of Canada
Speed skaters at the 1972 Winter Olympics
Speed skaters from Montreal